Kandivali (Pronunciation: [kaːn̪d̪iʋəliː]) formerly Khandolee is a suburb in the north of Mumbai, Maharashtra, India and has a large Marathi and Koli population followed by Gujarati population. The area also has huge amount of labour North Indian population coming from UP and Bihar region.

British records highlight a fact which is different from what is suggested in the rest of the article. The area names that ends with "vali" were the actual valleys to the small hills surrounding the area, and that's how we have Kandolee Valley to Kandivali.

History
In the 16th century, Kandivali consisted of a number of villages including Kandivali [is also known as Kandol] BunderPakhadi koliwada, and Charkop. The other old settlements in Kandivali were villages occupied by the local community, East Indian Community, Bhandaris and Kolis - who are recognized as the original native inhabitants of Mumbai, these communities are still living in Kandivali.
Artifacts found near Kandivali indicate that the region was inhabited in the Stone Age.

The Kandivali railway station was built more than 100 years ago in 1907, then known as Khandolee. The station derived its name from the East Indian village of Condolim. Earth and stones from Paran, a hillock east of the Kandivali railway station were quarried to reclaim the Bombay Backbay. On this account a railway line was opened, a workshop erected and a number of dwelling houses were constructed for officers and workmen numbering thousands. The area around Western Urban road between Malad and Kandivali had numerous stone quarries and was once famous for Malad Stone. Many heritage buildings in Mumbai were constructed with Malad stone between 1860 and 1930, most notable among them are David Sassoon library, Bombay House and the Western Railway building at Churchgate.

During the plagues of 1900s, the Fonseca's from Bandra migrated to Kandivali. They initially settled down to the east of Kandivali at Akurli and then moved to the west at Poisar. This is where they thrived and a few families still reside to this day. All the three major communities have their shrines in Poisar.

Landmarks and localities

The Church of Our Lady of Assumption, located off M.G. Road, was built in 1630 and was one of the oldest churches of Mumbai. The pond located at Shankar Mandir, Kandivali village is used for immersions during Ganesh Chaturthi (The pond is now known as Young Star Krida Mandal Visarjan Talao). Also located on M.G. Road is the Kala Hanuman Temple. A 150-year-old shrine  to Shri Karsangli Akurli Mata, Varahi Mata Temple is at Shankar Lane. 
Holy Cross Chapel located in Bunder Pakhadi Koliwada, was built in 1907. Holy Cross statue located in Bunder Pakhadi Koliwada naka Build by a Fisherman Anton Soz During The Great Bombay Plague of 1896. This Cross Has Stood The test of Time and has been a Source of Inspiration And Redemption to Believers of all faiths. Bunder Pakhadi Koliwada is located in Kandivali West. Bunder Pakhadi Koliwada, is a fishing village in Kandivali West. There are Christian Koli & Hindu Koli more than 200 Families. This village is older more than 400 years.

Mahavir Nagar is locality in Kandivali West.

Kandivali West, together with Kandivali East, Charkop and Poisar constitute the R-South ward of BMC. 

The Mahindra & Mahindra plant occupies a  built-up area and employs over 3,000. Industrial complexes such as Akurli Industrial Estate in East and Charkop Industrial Estate are in Western part, where several companies exists like Capsule Factory like IPCL, Jewelry Manufacturing Companies like Dvn Jewelry, Tribhivandas Bhimji Zaveri. Kandivali is also home to The Times of India printing press.

The Sports Authority of India has a huge training ground (SAI Sports Ground) for the popular football team Mahindra United.

Transportation

Kandivali railway station is a busy station on the Western Line of the Mumbai suburban railway. Poisar Bus Depot, one of the oldest BEST bus depot is located on S.V. Road in the western part of the neighbourhood. Road connectivity is provided by means of Western urban road on the east, S.V. Road and Link Road on the west. The BEST bus depot is close to the railway station on the eastern side of the neighbourhood and is the point of origin for localities in Kandivali (East) like Ashok Nagar, Hanuman Nagar, Damu Nagar, Samata Nagar, Thakur Village and Thakur Complex.

Two lines of Mumbai Metro (Line 2 and Line 7) will pass through the neighbourhood once operational. Line 2 will pass through Link Road on the western part and Line 7 will pass through the main arterial Western Urban road on the eastern side of the neighbourhood.

Line 7, once operational will be fully elevated and will run from Dahisar (East) to Andheri (East). Bandongri and Mahindra & Mahindra will be the two halts in Kandivali for the metro.

The Kandivali (West) post office (Pin Code 400067) is the oldest post office in Kandivali. The Kandivali (East) post office (Pin Code 400101) was initially located at Fonseca Compound on Akurli road near Kandivali railway station on the eastern side. It later got shifted to Samata Nagar.

Hospitals

Shatabdi Hospital was opened at S.V. Road by the Municipal Corporation of Greater Mumbai (MCGM) on 2 September 2013. It is named after Bharat Ratna Dr. Babasaheb Ambedkar. There are a couple of government hospitals in Kandivali(East). The Akurli Road Municipal Maternity Home (run by Brihanmumbai Municipal Corporation) is a two-storey hospital on Akurli Road opposite Dena Bank. There is an Employees State Insurance Scheme(ESIS) hospital as well. Both are within 5 minutes walking distance from the railway station. There is also Kandivali Hitwardhak Hospital located at Shree Mangubhai Dattani Bhavan, Swami Vivekananda Road, Shantilal Modi road, Kandivali West and hospital is run buy Shree Kandivali Hitwardhak Mandal which is Health charitable organizations in Mumbai.

Other hospitals are:

 Asha Hospital - General & Neurosurgery (near Akurli Road) 
 Western Hospital
 Agarwal Hospital
 Sanchaiti Hospital ( Near to Growels 101 Mall & Big Bazar )
 Phoenix Hospital
 Oscar Multi Specialty Hospital (Ganesh Nagar Charkop)
 Mangal Murti Hospital (Charkop Sector-5)
Namaha Hospital  (S V Road)
kandivali hitwardhak mandal( khm hospital)

Education

Kandivali has a number of English, Gujarati, Marathi and Hindi medium schools:
 Savitridevi Hariram Agarwal International School (IGCSE)
 Samta Vidya Mandir
 St. Lawrence High School
 Our Lady of Remedy High School
 St. Joseph's High School
 Dhanamal High School
 Sardar Vallabhbhai Patel School
 Shri Raghuveer English High School
 MLRT Gala Pioneer English School
 Cambridge School
 Lokhandwala Foundation School
 Thakur Public School
 Gundecha Education Academy
 Thakur Vidya Mandir
 Ryan International School (CBSE, Kandivali East)
 Oxford International School
 MJ Junior College Of Science
 Mumbai World High School, Charkop (First CBSE Board School in Kandivali West)
 Swami Vivekanand International School and Junior College
 Dr. T. R. Naravane High School
 The Trinity English High School
 Kapol Vidyanidhi International School (ICSE)
 Children's Academy
 Thakur Shyam Narayan High School
 Our Lady of Remedy High School (oldest institution in Kandivali - founded in 1926)

Major Institutions for Teaching Courses:
 Pal Rajendra High School (Kandivali East)
 Pal Rajendra B. Ed. College

Junior and Degree Colleges:
 Thakur College of Engineering and Technology
 Thakur College of Science and Commerce
 Kandivali Education Society (KES) Shroff College

Others:
 The Phoenix Archery Academy

References

External links

Suburbs of Mumbai